Roman Vorobey may refer to:

Roman Vorobey (footballer, born 1994), Ukrainian footballer
Roman Vorobey (footballer, born 1995), Ukrainian footballer